Antioch is an unincorporated community in Posey Township, Switzerland County, in the U.S. state of Indiana.

History
A post office was established at Antioch in 1894, and remained in operation until it was discontinued in 1902.

Geography

References

Unincorporated communities in Switzerland County, Indiana
Unincorporated communities in Indiana